Monica Niculescu was the defending champion, but chose not to participate.

Danka Kovinić won the title, defeating Hsieh Su-wei in the final, 6–2, 6–3.

Seeds

Main draw

Finals

Top half

Bottom half

References 
 Main draw

Open Feminin de Marseille - Singles